Bohumil Starnovský (born 3 October 1953) is a Czech former modern pentathlete who competed in the 1976 Summer Olympics and in the 1980 Summer Olympics. He won a silver medal in the team event in 1976. He has been devoting his time since the 90's to improving the Equestrian sport in the Czech Republic.

References

1953 births
Living people
Czech male modern pentathletes
Olympic modern pentathletes of Czechoslovakia
Czechoslovak male modern pentathletes
Modern pentathletes at the 1976 Summer Olympics
Modern pentathletes at the 1980 Summer Olympics
Olympic silver medalists for Czechoslovakia
Olympic medalists in modern pentathlon
Medalists at the 1976 Summer Olympics
Sportspeople from Prague